Jan Vaerman (1653–1731) was a Flemish mathematician.

He worked as a school teacher first in Bruges and then, from 1693 to 1717, in Tielt. He wrote about French grammar, arithmetic, geometry, trigonometry and planimetrics.

Works

References

1653 births
1731 deaths
Flemish mathematicians
People from Aalst, Belgium